Martina Hingis was the defending champion, but chose not to participate that year.

Maria Kirilenko won the title, defeating Mariya Koryttseva 6–0, 6–2 in the final.

Seeds

Draw

Final

Top half

Bottom half

Qualifying

Seeds

Qualifiers

Lucky losers
  Monique Adamczak
  Sandy Gumulya

Draw

First qualifier

Second qualifier

Third qualifier

Fourth qualifier

References

External links
Main and Qualifying Draw

2007 WTA Tour
Sunfeast Open